Żelichów  is a village in the administrative district of Gmina Cedynia, within Gryfino County, West Pomeranian Voivodeship, in north-western Poland, close to the German border. 

References

Villages in Gryfino County